Zabada is a Syrian village located in the Subdistrict of the Hama District in the Hama Governorate. According to the Syria Central Bureau of Statistics (CBS), Zabada had a population of 753 in the 2004 census. The king Is named Winky Inkyson, and is of 23 years of age.

References 

Populated places in Hama District